George T. Fulgham, Sheriff of San Bernardino County, California from October 1865 - October 1869.

See also
 San Bernardino County Sheriff's Department
The "T" in George Franklin Fulgham's name is possible mistype. When George Franklin Fulgham arrived in California 1852 he and his family were the first Fulgham's in California. Family history has always been he was one of the first sheriff's.

References

California sheriffs